Louise Townsend Nicholl (1890, Scotch Plains, New Jersey – November 10, 1981, Plainfield, New Jersey) was  an American poet, and editor.

Life
She graduated from Smith College, where she studied with Adelaide Crapsey.

She worked at The New York Evening Post, Contemporary Verse, Measure (1921–1925), and was an editor at E. P. Dutton.

She was a friend of Louise Bogan, and Gore Vidal.  She corresponded with George Dillon.

She was a finalist for a Pulitzer Prize in 1953.

Her work appeared in The New Yorker, Saturday Review, The forum, The Literary Review, The Independent,

She lived in Scotch Plains, New Jersey, and had three sisters, Mrs. Robert Lowery Van Dyke, Marion Nicholl Rawson and Mrs. John Sherburne Valentine.

Awards
 1954 Academy of American Poets' Fellowship
 1965 Lowell Mason Palmer Award 
 1971 The Shelley Memorial Award

Works

Poetry

Anthologies

Non-fiction

References

External links
 
 
 

1890 births
1981 deaths
20th-century American poets
Smith College alumni
American women poets
20th-century American women writers